Left Right Left may refer to:

 Left Right Left (TV series), an Indian television series that aired 2006–08
 Left Right Left (film), a 2013 Malayalam political drama film
 "Left, Right, Left" (Drama song), also known as "Left/Right", the lead single released from Drama's 1999 debut album, Causin' Drama
 "Left Right Left", a song by Charlie Puth from Nine Track Mind, 2016
Left, Right, Left: Political Essays 1977–2005, by Robert Manne, 2005

See also
 Left and right (disambiguation)